The petrochemical complex of Augusta-Priolo (called Polo petrolchimico siracusano in Italian) is a vast industrialized coastal area in eastern Sicily including the territory of the municipalities of Augusta, Priolo Gargallo and Melilli. Main industrial activities are oil refining, processing of oil derivatives and energy production. The complex, whose beginnings date back to 1949, has produced significant environmental problems for the coastline and the entire area, which accordingly is sometimes dubbed "Trinacria nera" (black Sicily or black triangle).

Among the companies in the region are ExxonMobil, Sasol, ERG, Polimeri Europa and Syndial.

See also
Triangle of death (Italy)
Angelo Moratti
Port of Augusta

References

External links

Petrochemical industry
Pollution in Italy
Petroleum industry in Italy
Province of Syracuse